Manifestoes of Surrealism is a book by André Breton, describing the aims, meaning, and political position of the Surrealist movement. It was published in 1969 by the University of Michigan press.

References

1969 non-fiction books
Works by André Breton
Works about surrealism
Art history books

ca:Manifest del Surrealisme